Leucopaxillus giganteus, commonly known as the giant leucopax (formerly as the giant clitocybe) or the giant funnel, is a saprobic species of fungus in the family Tricholomataceae. It has a white or pale cream cap, and is funnel-shaped when mature, with the gills running down the length of the stem. Considered by some to be a choice edible when young, this species has a cosmopolitan distribution, and is typically found growing in groups or rings in grassy pastures, roadside hedges, or woodland clearings. It has been shown to contain a bioactive compound with antibiotic properties.

Taxonomy
The species was first described as Agaricus giganteus by English naturalist James Sowerby in 1809, who illustrated it in his book Coloured Figures of English Fungi. Other historical synonyms include Clitocybe gigantea (Quélet, 1872), Paxillus giganteus (Fries, 1874), and Omphalia geotropa var. gigantea (Quélet, 1886). In 1934, Robert Kühner and Réné Maire created the genus Astropaxillus to contain species of Leucopaxillus with smooth spores, and they set L. giganteus as its type species. American mycologist Rolf Singer transferred it to its current genus in 1938, but recognized the value of maintaining a distinction of the smooth-spored species, and so made L. giganteus the type species of section Aspropaxilli.

Leucopaxillus giganteus is commonly known as the 'giant leucopax' (formerly as the 'giant clitocybe') or the 'giant funnel'.

Description

Younger specimens have caps that are convex, with a margin that is rolled downwards, but as the mushrooms matures the cap flattens out and eventually becomes shallowly funnel-shaped. The cap is smooth and creamy white in color, but may develop brown stains and circular cracks with age.

The cream-colored gills are narrow, crowded close together, and have a decurrent attachment—running down the length of the stem; in age the gills will darken to a buff color. There is no ring on the stem. At the base of the stem there is typically a dense, white mycelium that may form a mat. The flesh is firm, and also is white. Mature specimens are fragile, and difficult to remove from the ground without breaking.

Microscopic characteristics
When viewed in deposit, such as with a spore print, the spores appear white. When viewed with a light microscope, the spores are ovoid to ellipsoid, translucent (hyaline), have a smooth surface, and possess a broadly rounded apex and base; the spore dimensions are 6–8 by 3.5–5 µm. Like all Leucopaxillus species, the spores of L. giganteus are amyloid—meaning that they will absorb iodine when stained with Melzer's reagent—however, the extent of the stain may be variable. The spore-bearing cells, the basidia, are 25–40 by 4.5–8 µm, narrowly club-shaped, and are attached to either 2 or 4 spores. The hyphae of this species invariably have clamp connections.

Similar species
Leucopaxillus giganteus somewhat resembles Leucopaxillus candidus, but this latter species has a darker coloring and is found more commonly in montane regions. Leucopaxillus septentrionalis is also large and resembles L. giganteus at some points during its development, but may be distinguished by its nauseous odor, the tan color of the cap, and the adnate (gill squarely attached to the stem) to slightly adnexed (narrowly attached) gills. L. candidus tends to be smaller, with a cap diameter ranging from  broad. Leucopaxillus albissimus, Leucopaxillus gentianeus, Lactarius vellereus, and Infundibulicybe gibba have been suggested as additional lookalike species. Young specimens of L. giganteus may be confused with Clitocybe irina, C. praemagna or C. robusta. White Lactarius and Russula species may also appear superficially similar, but they have brittle flesh that breaks cleanly, unlike the fibrous flesh of L. giganteus.

Habitat and distribution

Leucopaxillus giganteus can form fairy rings in grassy areas like pastures, and is also found along roadsides; it produces fruiting bodies in summer and autumn. It is a saprobic species, and so derives nutrients by decomposing organic matter.

The fungus has a cosmopolitan distribution, and occurs throughout the temperate zone of the northern hemisphere. It is found in North America, Britain, and Europe. David Arora reports that in North America, it is most common in the Pacific Northwest and the Rocky Mountains.

Uses

Edibility
The species is nonpoisonous but reportedly poor in flavor. Although one source claims that it is a "choice edible when young", another source warns of the possibility of stomach cramps and diarrhea. Burrows suggests preparing specimens by cutting them up and boiling the pieces, and disposing of the water; then they may be used in dishes such as stews and casseroles. Because of its large size, one specimen can be enough to be consumed by several individuals. The odor has been said to be farinaceous or similar to fish meal; the taste and smell of the mushroom have also been alternately characterized as "mild and pleasant" or "truly disgusting". The species is also a favorite food for species of the fruit fly genus Drosophila.

Bioactive compounds
Leucopaxillus giganteus contains a bioactive compound named clitocine that has antibiotic activity against a number of bacteria that are pathogenic to humans, such as Bacillus cereus and Bacillus subtilis; an earlier (1945) study showed antibiotic activity against Mycobacterium tuberculosis, Salmonella typhi, and Brucea abortus. Clitocine has also been shown to promote apoptosis (cell death) in human cervical cancer cells in vitro (HeLa). The mycelia of L. giganteus, when grown in liquid culture, has been shown to produce phenols and flavonoids that have antioxidant activity.

References

Tricholomataceae
Fungi described in 1799
Fungi of North America
Fungi of South America
Fungi of Europe
Fungi found in fairy rings
Taxa named by James Sowerby